The 2014–15 Campeonato Nacional de Futebol Feminino was the 30th edition of the top division of the Portugal women's football championship. It started on 21 September 2014 and ended on 14 June 2015. Leixões SC  and Fundação Laura Santos returned to the category on the first try, replacing Escola Setúbal and 12-times champion 1º Dezembro.

CF Benfica won the championship for the first time and qualified for the Champions League. Valadares Gaia FC was the runner-up, while defending champion Atlético Ouriense was third. Leixões and FC Cesarense were relegated.

Teams

First stage

Second stage

Championship group

Relegation group

References

2014-15
Por
women's
Camp|